Potpeće (Serbian Cyrillic: Потпеће) is a village located in the Užice municipality of Serbia. In the 2002 census, the village had a population of 512.

The village lies at the foothills of Drežnička Gradina mountain. Spectacular cave Potpećka pećina, with the entrance of 50 m high, lies at the outskirts of the village.

Užice
Populated places in Zlatibor District